Breanna Noble "Breezy" Johnson (born January 19, 1996) is an American World Cup  alpine ski racer on the U.S. Ski Team. She competes in the speed events of downhill and super-G.

Born in Jackson, Wyoming, Johnson grew up in nearby Victor, Idaho, and made her World Cup debut in December 2015. In her first World Cup season in 2017, she finished eighteenth in the downhill standings. At the World Cup finals in March at Aspen, Johnson crashed in the downhill and suffered a tibial plateau fracture to her left leg. Johnson quickly recovered from this injury and in the 2018 season she finished eleventh in the downhill standings and competed in the Winter Olympics, finishing seventh in the downhill and fourteenth in the super-G.

While training in Chile in September 2018, Johnson partially tore her right anterior cruciate ligament (ACL) and missed the  After returning to snow, she tore her left posterior cruciate ligament (PCL) and medial collateral ligament (MCL) in her left knee in training in June 2019.

She returned to the World Cup circuit in January 2020 with a 25th in the downhill at Altenmarkt and consecutive top tens at Bansko. Her first World Cup podium came in December 2020 at a downhill in Val d'Isère, France.

She qualified to represent the United States at the 2022 Winter Olympics, but was injured and did not compete.

World Cup results

Season standings

^

Race podiums

 7 podiums  (7 DH); 18 top tens

World Championship results

Olympic results

Personal life
When turned 18, Johnson legally changed her first name from Breanna to Breezy, her long-time nickname which combines her given name and the word freezy. She came out as bisexual in 2022.

References

External links 

 
 Breezy Johnson at the U.S. Ski Team
 Breezy Johnson at Jackson Hole Resort

1996 births
21st-century American women
Alpine skiers at the 2018 Winter Olympics
American female alpine skiers
Bisexual sportspeople
Living people
Olympic alpine skiers of the United States
People from Jackson, Wyoming
People from Teton County, Idaho
Sportspeople from Idaho